Lachlan Robert Wells (born 27 February 1997) is an Australian professional baseball pitcher who is currently a free agent.

Career
Wells pitched in the Australian Baseball League from 2013 to 2015. The Minnesota Twins signed Wells to a minor league contract in 2014.

Wells made his professional debut in 2015 with the GCL Twins and spent the whole season there, going 5–2 with a 2.09 ERA and 0.97 WHIP in ten games (nine starts). In 2016, Wells pitched for the Cedar Rapids Kernels, compiling a 6–4 record and 1.77 ERA in 12 starts, and in 2017, he played for the Fort Myers Miracle where he pitched to a 4–10 record and 3.98 ERA in 16 games (14 starts). Wells missed the entire 2018 season after undergoing Tommy John surgery.

In 2019, Wells appeared in only 10 games split between the GCL Twins and Fort Myers, accumulating a 2-6 record and 4.22 ERA with 39 strikeouts in 49.0 innings pitched. Wells did not play in a game in 2020 due to the cancellation of the minor league season because of the COVID-19 pandemic. Wells also did not appear in a game for the organization in 2021 and was released by the Twins on February 22, 2022.

Personal
Wells pitched for the Australian national baseball team in the 2017 World Baseball Classic. His twin brother, Alexander Wells, pitched for the Baltimore Orioles.

References

External links

1997 births
Living people
Australian expatriate baseball players in the United States
Baseball pitchers
Cedar Rapids Kernels players
Fort Myers Miracle players
Gulf Coast Twins players
Sportspeople from Newcastle, New South Wales
Sydney Blue Sox players
Twin sportspeople
Australian twins
2017 World Baseball Classic players